Killa Season is the fifth studio album by Harlem rapper Cam'ron. The album was released on May 16, 2006, by Diplomat Records, Asylum Records and Atlantic Records. Cam'ron was also the executive producer of the album. The album received positive reviews but critics found the production and content lesser compared to Purple Haze. Killa Season sold 114,000 copies in its first week, debuting at number two on the Billboard 200.

Critical reception

Killa Season garnered a positive reception but music critics were mixed toward Cam's choices in production and lyrical content compared to Purple Haze. Peter Relic of Rolling Stone found criticism in the album's production and soul samples and Cam's insults towards Jay-Z but still found it entertaining with its wordplay, saying that "Killa Season proves Cam'ron can still bring heady verbiage and heat, but it's doubtful Jay-Z is losing much sleep." While also finding the production decent, Brian Sims of HipHopDX praised the album's skits and hooks and Cam's delivery for bringing light to creative imagery, saying that "As an industry veteran, Cam deserves a lot of credit for not using his album to address petty squabbles or provide some pseudo-intellectual autobiography." AllMusic editor David Jeffries said that the album was in need of a rewrite on some tracks but still found it enjoyable with memorable hooks and for showing a vulnerable side in Cam, concluding that "Killa Season would have benefited from trimming and better planning, but those things are extremely rare in the world of Dipset. Taking that into account, the album is exceptional and a good enough excuse for two more years of mouthing off and starting trouble."

Steve 'Flash' Juon of RapReviews praised the album for continuing Purple Hazes formula with tight wordplay and loose soul sample production, despite containing tracks that were Dipset holdovers, concluding that, "Nonetheless Cam fans should be happy with Killa Season, an album which continues his recent trend of solid (if somewhat unspectacular) solo CD's." Jayson Greene of Stylus Magazine found some of Cam's lyrics humorous at times, but found the production and guest artists lacking in variety in terms of go-to names, concluding with "Instead, Killa Season is a retreat, an album to satisfy the converted but one that will keep his mythical status confined to the 12-mile radius of his Manhattan home." Pitchfork writer Ryan Dombal felt the album was a disappointment compared to Purple Haze, finding the production lacking in energy and in need of more humorous songs ("I.B.S.") then aggressive diss tracks ("You Gotta Love It"). Dombal also pointed out that the limited edition of the album contained a DVD that reveals Cam'ron's battle with Jay-Z was all for publicity, concluding that, "If this underwhelming offering is any indication, such blind self-reference has considerably slowed down Cam'ron's once-unstoppable Dipset Movement."

Track listing

Personnel
Credits for Killa Season adapted from AllMusic.

 Eric "Ebo" Butler - engineer, mixing
 C. Alan Byrd - composer
 D.P. "Dad" Carter - composer
 Karen Civil - A&R
 Tony Dawson - mastering
 Mike DeSalvo - assistant engineer
 Walik Goshorn - photography

 Phil Knott - photography
 Gene McFadden - composer
 Ralph Rivera - art direction
 Charles Stepney - composer
 Maurice White - composer
 Verdine White - composer
 Jacob York - A&R

Charts

Weekly charts

Year-end charts

See also
 List of Billboard number-one R&B albums of 2006
 List of number-one rap albums of 2006 (U.S.)

References

2006 albums
Cam'ron albums
Diplomat Records albums
Albums produced by Ty Fyffe
Albums produced by the Alchemist (musician)
Albums produced by the Heatmakerz